Edgaras Riabko (born 10 April 1984) is a Lithuanian powerboat racer and a double UIM F2 European Champion. He currently races in the UIM F2 World Championship and finished runner-up in the 2020 series.

Lithuanian Motorboat Federation 

Riabko is the president of the Lithuanian Motorboat Federation ( Lietuvos Motorlaivių Federacija ) and has organized international powerboat races in Kaunus, Kupiskis and Zarasai.

Motorboat Academy 

He set-up a motorboat academy (Lietuvoje motorlaivių akademija) in 2020 which will be used to train young children the basics of powerboat racing with safe and responsible behaviour

References

Living people
1984 births